Paul Briggs may refer to:
 Paul Briggs (boxer) (born 1975), Australian boxer
 Paul Briggs (American football) (1920–2011), American football tackle
 Paul Briggs (animator) (born 1974), American storyboard artist, visual effects animator, and voice actor